Lindenberg Island is a circular volcanic island  in diameter, lying  north of Robertson Island and some  east-northeast of Cape Fairweather, off the east coast of the Antarctic Peninsula. It was discovered by a Norwegian whaling expedition under C.A. Larsen in December 1893, and was named by Larsen for a member of the firm of Woltereck and Robertson of Hamburg which sent him to the Antarctic.

See also 
List of Antarctic and sub-Antarctic islands

References

Islands of Graham Land
Nordenskjöld Coast
Volcanoes of Graham Land